Mount Elliott is a conspicuous mountain,  high, with a few small rock exposures and ice-free cliffs on the southeast side, standing  northwest of Cape Sobral,  northwest of Mount Hypothesis and  northeast of Rice Bastion, on the Nordenskjöld Coast of Graham Land, Antarctica. The peak surmounts Dinsmoor Glacier to the north, Mundraga Bay to the southeast, and Desudava Glacier to the southwest. It was charted in 1947 by the Falkland Islands Dependencies Survey (FIDS) and named for F. K. Elliott, the leader of the FIDS base at Hope Bay in 1947 and 1948.

References 

 SCAR Composite Antarctic Gazetteer.

Mountains of Graham Land
Nordenskjöld Coast